Ammu is a 2022 Indian Telugu-language drama thriller film written and directed by Charukesh Sekar and produced by Stone Bench Films. The film features Aishwarya Lekshmi, Naveen Chandra, and Bobby Simha in primary roles and premiered on Amazon Prime Video on 19 October 2022.

Plot 
Amudha alias Ammu (Aishwarya Lekshmi) gets married to her neighbor Ravindranath alias Ravi (Naveen Chandra), who works as a police inspector. The newlyweds arrive at Maharanipalli, where Ravi is the Circle Inspector of Police at the Maharanipalli station. The couple seem to have a great life ahead as both love and support one another, but things take a turn when Ravi slowly starts to become harsh, passive aggressive, manipulative, and cruel with Ammu, occasionally shouting at her and embarrassing her in front of his colleagues. The situation worsens when Ravi slaps Ammu for perceived backtalking to him on a small matter, while Ammu's parents were visiting them at Maharanipalli. Even though Ravi pacifies Ammu by saying sorry, it is evident that he doesn't regret the slapping but just want Ammu to not reveal this to her parents. Ammu later confides in her mother that Ravi slapped her, and asks her mother what she should do. Mother tells her she should do what she feels right. Ammu decides to keep quiet and bear with the unreasonable and cruel domestic torture from Ravi, in the hope that maybe if she invokes enough love in him, he will stop hurting her. Though she is fed up with getting abused by Ravi, and wants to end their relationship, she cannot do so because of fear and embarrassment. Ravi wants Ammu to conceive because his colleague's wife conceived and everyone were congratulating him. Ammu doesn't want to bring a child into this abusive home, so she takes contraceptive pills. Yet she gets pregnant, possibly because Ravi was secretly swapping her contraceptive pills. This puts Ammu in a worse emotional situation. She seeks help from Ravi's colleagues Satya (Satya Krishnan), Iqbal and her neighbor Linny (Anjali Ameer), and they take her to Ravi's superior's office so that she can file a complaint about Ravi's domestic violence. But Ravi spots her before she could reach the superior and manipulates her into admitting before Satya that he never hit her. Satya, Iqbal and Linny want to help her but are helpless as Ammu has let go of the one opportunity to complain to Ravi's superior. However, Ammu tells them that she has not given up hope and shall wait for the right opportunity to strike back. She tells them that she wants Ravi to admit before everyone that he has abused her, and then she wants to walk away from him with pride. As Ammu searches for a solution, Prabhu (Bobby Simha) comes to the Maharanipalli police station on parole to attend his sister Geetha's (Anusha Prabhu) wedding. However, Ravi harasses Prabhu, asking him to do unnecessary chores. Prabhu rebels one day, which leads to the cancellation of his parole. Ammu learns that Ravi will get into trouble if Prabhu misses any of his meetings at the station. So she, Sathya, Linny, and Iqbal (Prem Sagar) secretly hide him in Ammu's home from Ravi. This wreaks havoc on the police station and on Ravi's life. Later, because of this, Ravi gets suspended. Same time, Ammu also goes to Ravi's superior officer and complains directly of his domestic abuse. She also hands over a voice recording of him talking to Ammu in threatening manner and admitting that he indeed habitually abuses her, which was recorded by her using the same secret voice recorder with which Ravi used to spy on her to know what she was upto at the home. Ravi is arrested and it is implied that he is going to lose his job soon. Ammu and Prabhu wish each other and part ways after the incident, Prabhu back to the prison, and Ammu to the home she lived with Ravi. She and Linny have a peaceful evening tea and discusses future. Linny remarks that Ammu will not be a bad person even if she decides to abort the child conceived out of marital rape by Ravi. Ammu says she knows it. It isn't revealed what Ammu chose to do with the baby, but the movie ends with Ammu being on her way to her own home, and happily sharing a biryani with the beggar at Maharanipalli Bus Station, with whom she had shared her woes on an earlier day. She asks the beggar why he hadn't earlier told her not to go back to Ravi even when he knew she was doing wrong in deciding to go back to Ravi. The beggar tells her he didn't tell her anything because whether the decision was right or wrong, it had to be her decision. The film closes on a note of hope.

Cast 

Aishwarya Lekshmi as Amudha 'Ammu' Ravindranath
Naveen Chandra as CI S. Ravindranath 'Ravi'
Bobby Simha as Prabhu Das
Parvathi T. as Kalpana, Ammu's mother
Raja Ravindra as Dileep, Ammu's father
Appaji Ambarisha Darbha as Ravi's father
Pramodhini as Ravi's mother
Satya Krishnan as Constable Satya
Anjali Ameer as Linny
Prem Sagar as Iqbal
Raghu Babu as the benevolent beggar in the bus station
Kancharapalem Raju as Ismail
Sanjay Swaroop as DIG Reddy
Guru Charan as SI Diwakar
Anusha Prabhu as Geetha
Sai Badram Dinesh as Geetha's fiancé
T. V. Raman as Prasad
Jammalamadugu Davood as Mansoor Ali Khan

Reception 
A critic from The New Indian Express wrote that "Ammu is a film that can make many squirm with uneasiness, but it will definitely give a sense of hope and representation to others". A critic from The Hindustan Times said that "Ammu will definitely be one of the most important films of this year. It takes a very relevant issue that has been a topic of discussion for a long time and gives it a very interesting spin with the way it chooses to end the film". A critic from The Hindu opined that "Despite its poor third act, the writing of the first two is such that you might still find yourself searching for answers and closure. For invoking that in us, and for everything else it stands for, Ammu is a win".

References

External links 

 

2022 films
2020s Telugu-language films
Indian thriller drama films
2022 thriller drama films
Amazon Prime Video original films
Indian direct-to-video films
2022 direct-to-video films
2022 directorial debut films
Films set in Andhra Pradesh
Films about domestic violence
Indian films about revenge